Fairmount Hotel or The Fairmount Hotel may refer to:
Fairmount Hotel (Portland, Oregon)
Fairmount Hotel (San Antonio, Texas)
Fairmount Apartments (Jersey City, New Jersey)

See also
Fairmont Hotel (disambiguation)